Willie James Tullis (born April 5, 1958) is a former American football defensive back. He played  in the National Football League (NFL) for eight seasons, with the Houston Oilers (1981–1984), the New Orleans Saints (1985–1986) and the Indianapolis Colts (1987–1988). Tullis attended Headland High School in Headland, Alabama, where he was a high school football star during the 1970s

References

1958 births
Living people
American football defensive backs
American football quarterbacks
Houston Oilers players
Indianapolis Colts players
New Orleans Saints players
Troy Trojans football players
People from Henry County, Alabama
Players of American football from Alabama